The FIBA Asia Stanković Cup 2008 served as the qualifying tournament for the 2009 FIBA Asia Championship. This competition is distinct from the Stanković Cup intercontinental tournament attended by teams outside the FIBA Asia zone.

Qualification
According to the FIBA Asia rules, each zone had one place, and the hosts (Kuwait) and Asian champion (Iran) were automatically qualified. The other three places are allocated to the zones according to performance in the 2007 FIBA Asia Championship.

* Withdrew

Results

Final standing

Awards

References
2nd FIBA Asia Stankovic Cup

Stankovic Cup, 2008
Fiba Asia Stankovic Cup, 2008
B
FIBA Asia Challenge
Sport in Kuwait City